Sergey Nikolayevich Firsanov (born 3 July 1982) is a Russian professional road bicycle racer, who last rode for UCI Professional Continental team .

Career
Born in Velikiye Luki, Firsanov has competed as a professional since 2005, competing for the  squad during two separate spells, as well as the Premier,  and  squads before signing for the newly formed  team for the 2012 season.

Firsanov achieved the team's first overall victory at the Vuelta a la Comunidad de Madrid; after a third-place finish in the race-opening individual time trial, Firsanov won the race's second and final stage by almost two minutes from his nearest competitors, to comfortably take the general classification victory.

He was named in the start list for the 2016 Giro d'Italia.

Major results

2001
 9th Tour du Jura
2004
 9th Overall Grand Prix Guillaume Tell
2005
 1st  Overall Giro della Toscana
 4th Overall Grand Prix of Sochi
2006
 1st Stage 6 (ITT) Bałtyk–Karkonosze Tour
 2nd Overall Tour of Bulgaria
1st Stage 5a
 3rd Szlakiem Walk Majora Hubala
 6th Overall Five Rings of Moscow
 6th Overall Okolo Slovenska
 7th Grand Prix of Moscow
 8th Overall Grand Prix of Sochi
 8th Coupe des Carpathes
2007
 1st Memorial Oleg Dyachenko
 2nd Overall Five Rings of Moscow
 3rd Coupe des Carpathes
 5th Overall Tour of Małopolska
 7th Overall Le Triptyque des Monts et Châteaux
 7th Puchar Ministra Obrony Narodowej
 8th Overall Circuit des Ardennes
 8th Mayor Cup
 9th Overall Rhône-Alpes Isère Tour
 9th Memoriał Henryka Łasaka
2008
 1st  Overall Way to Pekin
1st Points classification
1st Mountains classification
1st Stages 2, 3 (ITT) & 7
 2nd Overall Ringerike GP
1st Stage 2
 3rd Overall Okolo Slovenska
1st Stage 4a (ITT)
 3rd Overall Les 3 Jours de Vaucluse
 3rd Overall Tour of Małopolska
 4th Overall Rhône-Alpes Isère Tour
 7th Coupe des Carpathes
2009
 1st  Overall Boucle de l'Artois
1st Stage 3
 1st  Overall Ringerike GP
1st Stage 2
 1st  Overall Friendship People North-Caucasus Stage Race
 2nd Duo Normand (with Aleksejs Saramotins)
 5th Overall Rhône-Alpes Isère Tour
 5th Grand Prix of Moscow
 5th Rogaland GP
 7th Overall Tønsberg 4-dagers
1st Stage 4 (ITT)
2010
 1st  Overall Friendship People North-Caucasus Stage Race
1st Stages 4 & 5 (ITT)
 1st  Overall Five Rings of Moscow
1st Stage 1
 2nd Overall Ringerike GP
 3rd Overall Rhône-Alpes Isère Tour
 4th Westrozebeke
 6th Memorial Oleg Dyachenko
 7th Overall Danmark Rundt
 7th Chrono Champenois
 10th Grand Prix of Moscow
2011
 1st  Overall Friendship People North-Caucasus Stage Race
1st Stages 1 (ITT), 5, 6, 7 (ITT) & 12
 1st  Overall Five Rings of Moscow
1st Stage 1
 2nd Overall Grand Prix of Adygeya
1st Stage 3
 5th Overall Okolo Slovenska
 5th Mayor Cup
 6th Overall Settimana Ciclistica Lombarda
 7th Overall Tour de Serbie
 9th Grand Prix of Donetsk
2012
 1st  Overall Vuelta a la Comunidad de Madrid
1st Points classification
1st Stage 2
 2nd Overall Grand Prix of Adygeya
1st Stage 1 (ITT)
 3rd Eschborn-Frankfurt City Loop
 4th Overall Tour of Belgium
 5th Overall Tour of Norway
 6th GP Industria & Artigianato di Larciano
 7th Overall Tour of Qinghai Lake
2013
 5th Overall Settimana Ciclistica Lombarda
 10th Overall Vuelta a Castilla y León
 10th Tre Valli Varesine
2014
 1st  Overall Tour of Kavkaz
1st Stage 4
 3rd Overall Grand Prix of Adygeya
 6th GP Industria & Artigianato di Larciano
 6th Giro di Toscana
 7th Overall Settimana Internazionale di Coppi e Bartali
2015
 1st  Overall Grand Prix of Adygeya
1st Stage 2
 1st Grand Prix of Sochi Mayor
 2nd Tre Valli Varesine
 4th Tour of Almaty
 5th Overall Tour of Croatia
 5th Overall Tour d'Azerbaïdjan
1st Stage 5
 7th Overall Grand Prix of Sochi
 9th Prueba Villafranca de Ordizia
2016
 1st  Overall Settimana Internazionale di Coppi e Bartali
1st  Mountains classification
1st Stage 2
 1st Giro dell'Appennino
 4th Overall Giro del Trentino
2018
 9th Grand Prix de Plumelec-Morbihan
 10th Boucles de l'Aulne

Grand Tour general classification results timeline

References

External links
RusVelo profile

1982 births
Living people
People from Velikiye Luki
Russian male cyclists
Sportspeople from Pskov Oblast